The Chamber Philharmonic Taipei is a chamber orchestra based in Taipei, Taiwan, supported by the Taipei City Government Department of Cultural Affairs and National Culture and Arts Foundation. Together with its affiliated choir, the Bach Choir, the orchestra hosts concerts in Zhongshan Hall, National Recital Hall, among other venues in Taipei.

History
The orchestra was founded in spring 2008 by conductor Wilbur Lin.

See also
 List of symphony orchestras in Taiwan

References

External links
 Official website

2008 establishments in Taiwan
Taiwanese orchestras